The enzyme methylphosphothioglycerate phosphatase (EC 3.1.3.14) catalyzes the reaction

S-methyl-3-phospho-1-thio-D-glycerate + H2O  S-methyl-1-thio-D-glycerate + phosphate

This enzyme belongs to the family of hydrolases, specifically those acting on phosphoric monoester bonds.  The systematic name is S-methyl-3-phospho-1-thio-D-glycerate phosphohydrolase. This enzyme is also called methylthiophosphoglycerate phosphatase.

References 

 

EC 3.1.3
Enzymes of unknown structure